Xu Lei (born 11 January 2000) is a Chinese footballer currently playing as a midfielder for Meizhou Hakka.

Club career
Xu Lei would play for the Shanghai Shenhua youth team before being loaned out to second tier club Inner Mongolia Zhongyou on 30 July 2020. He would make his debut on 13 September 2020, in a league game against Beijing Sport University that ended in a 1-0 defeat. The following season he was loaned out again to another second tier club in Meizhou Hakka on 14 April 2021. He would make his debut on 25 April 2021, in a league game against Xinjiang Tianshan Leopard that ended in a 2-1 victory. He would be part of the squad that gained promotion to the top tier after coming second within the division at the end of the 2021 China League One campaign.

Career statistics
.

References

External links

2000 births
Living people
Chinese footballers
China youth international footballers
Association football midfielders
China League One players
Shanghai Shenhua F.C. players
Inner Mongolia Zhongyou F.C. players
Meizhou Hakka F.C. players
21st-century Chinese people